is a former Japanese football player.

Playing career
Katsura was born in Tokushima Prefecture on March 6, 1970. After graduating from Osaka University of Health and Sport Sciences, he joined Yokohama Flügels in 1992. He played many matches as midfielder since 1993. However, his opportunity to play decreased from 1995 and he moved to the Japan Football League club Kawasaki Frontale in 1997. He played many matches and the club was promoted to J2 League in 1999 and J1 League in 2000. However, he could not play at all in the match since 2000. In 2002, he moved to the Japan Football League club Sagawa Express Tokyo. He retired at end of the season 2003.

Club statistics

References

External links

Kawasaki Frontale

1970 births
Living people
Osaka University of Health and Sport Sciences alumni
Association football people from Tokushima Prefecture
Japanese footballers
J1 League players
J2 League players
Japan Football League (1992–1998) players
Japan Football League players
Yokohama Flügels players
Kawasaki Frontale players
Sagawa Shiga FC players
Association football midfielders